Grand Lake o' the Cherokees is situated in Northeast Oklahoma in the foothills of the Ozark Mountain Range. It is often simply called Grand Lake. It is administered by the Grand River Dam Authority (GRDA).

History
The Encyclopedia of Oklahoma History and Culture credits Henry Holderman, a citizen of the Cherokee Nation of Oklahoma as first envisioning Grand River as a source for hydroelectric power for the Cherokee Nation. Even prior to Oklahoma statehood in 1907, Holderman began building political support for such a project. A feasibility study by the Army Corps of Engineers attracted favorable attention in the Oklahoma legislature, leading to creation of the Grand River Dam Authority (GRDA), a state agency, in 1935.  Construction began in 1938 on the Pensacola Dam on the Grand River (lower Neosho River) as a Works Progress Administration project. The dam was completed in March 1940, creating the lake behind it. Between 1941 and 1946, the U.S. government took control of Pensacola Dam to divert power to the war effort. Control was returned to the GRDA by the Congress and President Truman amid local celebration in August 1946.

Pensacola Dam

 Pensacola Dam is claimed to be the longest multiple arch dam in the world, its main span consisting of 51 arches totaling  in length, and supporting a walkway and State Highway 28, a narrow two-lane highway. A 120 megawatt, 6-unit powerhouse sits at the west end, with 21 spillways on the east end. The project's chief engineer was W. R. Holway (who was also responsible for Tulsa's Spavinaw water project), while the architect of record for the PWA-style Art Deco design of the dam and powerhouse was Tulsan John Duncan Forsyth.

Another mile east, through the town of Disney, lie two small sister dams known as "the spillways" with an additional 21 gates, surrounded by public parks and launching ramp. 510,000 cubic yards (390,000 m3) of concrete were used in the construction of Pensacola Dam, poured 24 hours a day in just 20 months with Depression-era labor. The lake, and the electric utilities, as well as other projects in the region, along the Grand River are administered by the Grand River Dam Authority, an agency created by the Oklahoma legislature in 1935.

Unlike other lakes in Oklahoma, Grand Lake is a deep and mostly rocky lake. The average depth for Grand Lake is 36.3 feet. In recent years, low fall elevations of 741 were kept by the GRDA to allow millet seeding for migratory waterfowl, resulting in conflict between property owners, environmentalists, and federal agencies. While not expressly built for flood control, Grand Lake contributes to the flood-prone Arkansas River watershed. The Army Corps of Engineers controls releases into the McClellan-Kerr Arkansas River Navigation System when lake levels exceed , although locking into Grand Lake is not possible. Grand Lake and its neighbor, Lake Hudson (also managed by the GRDA), are the only two major lakes in the state where one can build directly on the waterfront.

Residents of the town of Miami and Native American groups have objected to proposals to increase high water levels at Pensacola Dam in order to maintain the water level at Grand Lake. Miami residents are concerned that when water backs up downstream from Miami on the Neosho River, this can contribute to  Miami's flooding problems.

Recreation

The lake is a popular destination for entertainment in the Green Country region. There are a number of shows in the area, as well as resorts, and a sixty-seven-foot long, twin deck paddle wheel riverboat called the Cherokee Queen, which has been in operation since the 1940s.  Consistently ranked among the top bass fishing lakes in the United States, Grand also houses a wide variety of other sport and non-sport fishing. Due to its predictable winds, it attracts sailboaters from across the country as well.

In literature
In the book The Bean Trees by Barbara Kingsolver, Taylor, Turtle, Estevan, and Esperanza visit the lake.

See also
Lakes in Oklahoma

References

Further reading
 Voices of Oklahoma interview with Dr. Bruce Howard about the creation of Grand Lake O' the Cherokees and Pensacola Dam. First person interview conducted on December 2, 2014 with Dr. Bruce Howard about the creation of Grand Lake O' the Cherokees and Pensacola Dam.

External links
Grand Lake area information, photos and videos on TravelOK.com Official travel and tourism website for the State of Oklahoma
Grand Lake Maps
 Encyclopedia of Oklahoma History and Culture - Grand River Dam Authority
 Oklahoma Digital Maps: Digital Collections of Oklahoma and Indian Territory

Protected areas of Delaware County, Oklahoma
Protected areas of Mayes County, Oklahoma
Protected areas of Ottawa County, Oklahoma
Reservoirs in Oklahoma
Lakes of the U.S. Interior Highlands
Bodies of water of the Ozarks
Works Progress Administration in Oklahoma
Ozarks